The Vultee BT-13 Valiant is an American World War II-era basic (a category between primary and advanced) trainer aircraft built by Vultee Aircraft for the United States Army Air Corps, and later US Army Air Forces. A subsequent variant of the BT-13 in USAAC/USAAF service was known as the BT-15 Valiant, while an identical version for the US Navy was known as the SNV and was used to train naval aviators for the US Navy and its sister services, the US Marine Corps and US Coast Guard.

Design and development

The Vultee BT-13 was the basic trainer flown by most American pilots during World War II. It was the second phase of the three phase training program for pilots. After primary training in PT-13, PT-17, or PT-19 trainers, the student pilot moved to the more complex Vultee for continued flight training. The BT-13 had a more powerful engine and was faster and heavier than the primary trainer. It required the student pilot to use two way radio communications with the ground and to operate landing flaps and a two-position Hamilton Standard controllable-pitch propeller (or, more commonly, a constant-speed propeller). It did not, however, have retractable landing gear nor a hydraulic system. The flaps were operated by a crank-and-cable system. Its pilots nicknamed it the "Vultee Vibrator."

Due to the demand for this aircraft, and others which used the same Pratt & Whitney engine, some were equipped with Wright powerplants of similar size and power built in 1941–42. The Wright-equipped aircraft were designated BT-15.

The Navy adopted the P&W powered aircraft as their main basic trainer, designating it the SNV. The BT-13 production run outnumbered all other Basic Trainer (BT) types produced.

In 1938, Vultee chief designer Richard Palmer began designing a single-engine fighter aircraft. About that time, the Army Air Corps issued a solicitation for an advanced trainer, with the promise of a substantial order if selected. Palmer adapted his design concept from a fighter to an advanced trainer, resulting in the V-51 prototype.

The prototype flew on 24 March 1939 as a cantilever low-wing monoplane of all-metal construction, with fabric-covered control surfaces. It was powered by a Pratt & Whitney R-1340-S3H1-G Wasp radial engine of 600 hp (450 kW), driving a two-blade variable-pitch metal propeller. It had an enclosed cockpit for the instructor and student, integral wing fuel tanks, and a hydraulic system to operate the flaps and retractable main landing gear.

The V-51 was entered into the USAAC competition as the BC-51 in May 1939. The USAAC instead chose the North American BC-2 in the competition, but also purchased the BC-51 prototype for further study, designating it the BC-3. Palmer refined his design, resulting in the VF-54, with the goal of selling the trainer to other countries. It used the same basic airframe as the VF-51, but was fitted with a lower powered engine. However, no export sales resulted from this proposal.

The V-54 was further refined, resulting in the VF-54A, with a well-faired fixed landing gear, manually-operated landing flaps, powered by a Pratt & Whitney R-985-T3B Wasp Jr. radial rated at 450 hp (340 kW). It was offered to the USAAC in this form, and in August 1939 the type was ordered as the BT-13. The initial order was for 300 aircraft with a Pratt & Whitney R-985-25 radial. The first aircraft was delivered to the USAAC in June 1940.

The BT-13A was produced to the extent of 7,037 aircraft and differed only in the substitution of a Pratt & Whitney R-985-AN-1 radial engine, and deletion of the landing gear fairings. 1,125 units designated BT-13B were then produced; they differed from the A model in replacing the 12v electrical system with a 24v system.

Due an industry-wide demand for the Pratt & Whitney R-985 engine, a total of 1,263 units were then produced incorporating the Wright R-975-11 engine of equal power rating. They were accepted by the USAAC as BT-15.

The US Navy also ordered 1,150 BT-13A models under the designation SNV-1. It also ordered another 650 units designated SNV-2, based on the BT-13B.

Once in service, the aircraft quickly got its nickname of "Vibrator." There are several explanations given for this nickname. 1: Because it had a tendency to shake quite violently as it approached its stall speed. 2. During more adventurous maneuvers the canopy vibrated. 3. On takeoff, the aircraft caused windows on the ground to vibrate. 4. The two-position propeller had an irritating vibration in high pitch. The BT-13 served its intended purpose well. It and its successors were unforgiving aircraft to fly, but were also extremely agile. Thus the BT-13 made a good aircraft to help transition many hundreds of pilots toward their advanced trainers and fighters yet to be mastered.  

The BT-13 was not without its faults.  Some had been built with plywood tailcones and empennages, which did not always remain firmly aligned with the aircraft. The tail was held on with only three bolts and after several in-flight failures, the Navy restricted the aircraft from aerobatic and violent maneuvers.  The Navy declared the SNV obsolete in May 1945 and replaced it in the basic training role with the SNJ (T-6). The Army also replaced the BT-13 with the AT-6 before the end of the war.

After World War II, virtually all were sold as surplus for a few hundred dollars each. Many were purchased just to obtain their engines, which were mounted on surplus biplanes (such as Stearmans) to replace their less powerful engines for use as cropdusters. The BT airframes were then scrapped. Several others were modified as multi-passenger civilian aircraft; one as the "Viceroy" and at least two others by a different firm. Today, some "BT's" (collectively, BT-13s, BT-15s and SNVs) are still flying, though in very limited numbers (and none in military or government service).

Variants

BC-3
Vultee Model V.51 with retractable landing gear and a 600hp P&W R-1340-45, one built, not developed.
BT-13
Vultee Model V.54 with fixed undercarriage and a 450hp P&W R-985-25 engine, 300 built.
BT-13A
As BT-13 but fitted with a 450hp R-985-AN-1 engine and minor changes, 6407 built, survivors re-designated T-13A in 1948.
BT-13B
As BT-13A but with a 24-volt electrical system, 1125 built.
BT-15
As BT-13A with a 450hp Wright R-975-11 engine, 1693 built.
XBT-16
One BT-13A was re-built in 1942 by Vidal with an all-plastic fuselage as the XBT-16.
SNV-1
BT-13As for the United States Navy, 1350 transferred from United States Army Air Corps.
SNV-2
BT-13Bs for the United States Navy, 650 transferred from United States Army Air Corps.
T-13A
Surviving BT-13As were re-designated in 1948, due to dual allocation of T-13 with the PT-13 in practice they were still known as the BT-13 to avoid confusion.

Operators

 Argentine Air Force
 Argentine Navy

 Bolivian Air Force (37 BT-13 between 1942 and 1958)

 Brazilian Air Force (120 BT-15s)

 Chilean Air Force

 Colombian Air Force (Fourteen BT-15s)

 Cuban Air Force

 Dominican Air Force

 Ecuadorian Air Force

 Air Force of El Salvador

 French Air Force

 Guatemalan Air Force

Haiti Air Corps

 Honduran Air Force

 Indonesian Air Force

 Israeli Air Force

 Nicaraguan Air Force

 Paraguayan Air Arm 10 BT-13A received through Lend-Lease 1942–1943. Two BT-13 bought in Argentina in 1947.
 Paraguayan Naval Aviation Three BT-13 donated by Argentina in the 1960s.

Peruvian Air Force

 Soviet Air Force

 United States Air Force
 United States Army Air Forces
 United States Navy

Venezuelan Air Force
Centro de Instruccion Aeronautica Civil

Surviving aircraft
Australia
 41-23063 – BT-13A airworthy with John Kempton in Albury, New South Wales.

Brazil
 1072 – BT-15 on static display at the Museu Aeroespacial in Rio de Janeiro, Rio de Janeiro.
 42-1216 – BT-13A in storage at Museu TAM in São Carlos, São Paulo.

Canada
42-89379 – BT-13A airworthy in Edenvale, Ontario.

Indonesia

 B-427 – BT-13A on display at Ngurah Rai International Airport in Denpasar, Bali.
 B-604 – BT-13A on display at Suryadarma Air Force Base in Kalijati, Subang Regency, West Java.
 B-605 – BT-13A on display at Gembira Loka Zoo in Yogyakarta.
 B-608 – BT-13A on display at Jurug Solo Zoo in Surakarta, Central Java.
 B-610 – BT-13A on display at Gedung Juang 45 Subang in Subang Regency, West Java.
 B-616 – BT-13A on display at Indonesian Air Force Academy in Yogyakarta.
 B-620 – BT-13A on display at Sempor Dam in Kebumen Regency, Cemtral Java.
 B-622 – BT-13A on display at Mangkang Zoo in Semarang, Central Java. It was stripped of all markings and painted blue.
 B-633 – BT-13A on display at Dirgantara Mandala Museum in Yogyakarta.

Netherlands

 42-43210 – BT-13A airworthy at the Early Birds Museum on Lelystad Airport in the Netherlands.

United States

 3022 – SNV-1 on static display at Main Campus of the Kalamazoo Air Zoo in Kalamazoo, Michigan.
 156739 – SNV-1 airworthy at the Estrella Warbirds Museum in Paso Robles, California.
 41-10418 – BT-13A on static display at the Combat Air Museum in Topeka, Kansas.
 41-10571 – BT-13A on static display at the Quik Stop Mini-Mart in Caruthers, California. It is mounted nose-first on top of a gas station island awning.
 41-10814 – BT-13A airworthy with Vultee Resource & Management in Yukon, Oklahoma.
 41-11355 – BT-13A on static display at the National Naval Aviation Museum in Pensacola, Florida. It is painted as an SNV-1.
 41-11538 – BT-13A airworthy with the Commemorative Air Force Minnesota Wing in South St. Paul, Minnesota.
 41-11584 – BT-13A on static display at the Combat Air Museum in Topeka, Kansas.
 41-21178 - BT-13A airworthy with the Commemorative Air Force in Houston, Texas.
 41-21218 – BT-13A under repair to airworthy condition with Valiant Effort in Livermore, California.
 41-21487 – BT-13A on static display at the March Field Air Museum in Riverside, California. It is painted as 41–22365.
 41-21933 – BT-13A on static display at the Travis Air Force Base Heritage Center at Travis Air Force Base in Fairfield, California.
 41-22124 – BT-13A in storage at the Paul E. Garber Preservation, Restoration, and Storage Facility of the National Air and Space Museum in Suitland, Maryland.
 41-22204 – BT-13A on static display at the South Dakota Air and Space Museum in Box Elder, South Dakota.
 41-22386 – BT-13A on static display at the Moffett Field Historical Society Museum in Mountain View, California.
 41-22441 – BT-13A airworthy at the Mid-Atlantic Air Museum in Reading, Pennsylvania.
 41-23075 – BT-13A airworthy on loan from Rene J. Vercruyssen to the Chico Air Museum in Chico, California.
 42-04130 – BT-13A on static display at Goodfellow Air Force Base in San Angelo, Texas.
 42-41303 – BT-15 on static display at the Gunter Annex of Maxwell Air Force Base in Montgomery, Alabama.
 42-42353 – BT-13A on static display at the Pima Air Museum in Tucson, Arizona.
 42-88675 – BT-13A airworthy at the National Wasp WWII Museum in Sweetwater, Texas.
 42-88708 – BT-13 on display at the Naval Air Station Wildwood Aviation Museum in Rio Grande, New Jersey.
 42-88855 – BT-13A airworthy with Barry D. Burns in Hubbard, Oregon.
 42-89607 – BT-13B airworthy at the Yanks Air Museum in Chino, California.
 42-89678 – BT-13A on static display at the Castle Air Museum in Atwater, California.
 42-90018 – BT-13B on static display at the Museum of Aviation at Robins Air Force Base in Warner Robins, Georgia.
 42-90026 – BT-13B airworthy with the Alaska Wing of the Commemorative Air Force in Anchorage, Alaska.
 42-90296 – BT-13B airworthy at the War Eagles Air Museum in Santa Teresa, New Mexico.
 42-90590 – BT-13B airworthy with Ryan Shively of Richland, Washington. It was delivered to the USAAF in May 1944 and served with the 54th Fighter Squadron, 2nd Air Commando Group, 4501st Base Unit, and 338th Base Unit.
 42-90629 – BT-13B on static display at the National Museum of the United States Air Force in Dayton, Ohio.
 79-947 – BT-13B airworthy with the Planes of Fame Air Museum in Chino, California.
 c/n 7832 – BT-13A on static display at the Evergreen Aviation & Space Museum in McMinnville, Oregon.
 c/n 8408 – BT-13 on static display at the Fort Worth Aviation Museum in Fort Worth, Texas.
 Unknown ID – Unknown variant in storage in unrestored condition at the Planes of Fame Air Museum in Chino, California.
 Unknown ID – BT-13 under restoration at the Fargo Air Museum in Fargo, North Dakota.

Popular culture

The 1942 Army training film Winning Your Wings opens with actor Jimmy Stewart landing a BT-13.

BT-13s were used by Twentieth Century Fox in the 1970 motion picture "Tora! Tora! Tora!"; 9 units were purchased in 1968 and modified to resemble Japanese "Val" dive bombers. The "Zero" fighters and "Kate" torpedo bombers in that movie were modified Harvard IV's.

After filming, the studio sold the altered aircraft to private owners. Many are still flying, several of them as part of the Commemorative Air Force's "Tora! Tora! Tora!" squadron, which performs air battle reenactments at air shows. Several "Tora" aircraft also appeared in the later "Pearl Harbor" film.

Specifications (BT-13A)

See also
Related development:
 P-66 Vanguard
Comparable aircraft:
North American T-6 Texan

References

Bibliography

External links

BT-13
1930s United States military trainer aircraft
Single-engined tractor aircraft
Low-wing aircraft
World War II trainer aircraft of the United States
Aircraft first flown in 1939